Alison Webb (born October 25, 1961) is a retired judoka from Canada, who won the silver medal in the women's half-heavyweight (– 72 kg) competition at the 1987 Pan American Games. She represented her native country at the 1992 Summer Olympics in Barcelona, Spain.

See also
 Judo in Quebec
Judo in Canada

References
 Profile

1961 births
Living people
Anglophone Quebec people
Canadian female judoka
Judoka at the 1992 Summer Olympics
Olympic judoka of Canada
Sportspeople from Montreal
Pan American Games silver medalists for Canada
Pan American Games bronze medalists for Canada
Judoka at the 1990 Commonwealth Games
Commonwealth Games medallists in judo
Commonwealth Games silver medallists for Canada
Pan American Games medalists in judo
Judoka at the 1987 Pan American Games
Judoka at the 1991 Pan American Games
Medalists at the 1987 Pan American Games
Medalists at the 1991 Pan American Games
Medallists at the 1990 Commonwealth Games